The 2022 end of year rugby union tests, also known as the 2022 Autumn internationals, were a number of rugby union test matches played during the months of October and November. Some of the games were known as the Autumn Nations Series for marketing purposes. Also involved in matches were some second-tier teams. These international games count towards World Rugby's ranking system, with a team typically playing from two to four matches during this period.

Fixtures

October

Notes:
 Syuhei Takeuchi and Kenji Shimokawa (both Japan) made their international debuts.

Notes:
 Jack Dempsey (Scotland), Jock Campbell and Langi Gleeson (both Australia) made their international debuts.
 Australia recorded their first test victory over Scotland since November 2016, following three consecutive wins for the Scots, thus reclaiming the Hopetoun Cup.

4/5/6 November

Notes:
 Atila Septar (Romania) and Joaquín Milesi (Chile) made their international debuts.

Notes:
 Lorenzo Cannone, Enrico Lucchin (both Italy), Brian Alainu'uese, Tala Gray, Duncan Paia'aua, Taleni Seu and Jeffery Toomaga-Allen (all Samoa) made their international debuts.
 Italy recorded their biggest ever victory over Samoa.

Notes:
 Murphy Walker (Scotland), Sireli Maqala, Livai Natave and Ratu Leone Rotuisolia (all Fiji) made their international debuts.
 Manasa Saulo (Fiji) earned his 50th test cap.

Notes:
 Rio Dyer and Sam Costelow (both Wales) made their international debuts.
 Aaron Smith (New Zealand) earned his 113th test cap, surpassing Dan Carter as the most-capped back in All Blacks history.
 Ofa Tu'ungafasi (New Zealand) earned his 50th test cap.
 Referee Wayne Barnes became the second referee to officiate his 100th test match, and also equalled Nigel Owens' record for the most test matches refereed.
 New Zealand equaled their record points total against Wales, matching the total of 55 achieved in June 2003. It was also their highest points total away to the Welsh, breaking the previous record of 54 set in October 2021.

Notes:
 Jimmy O'Brien (Ireland) made his international debut.
 Conor Murray became the eighth player to earn his 100th test cap for Ireland.

Notes:
 Gonzalo López Bontempo, Raúl Calzón, Alejandro Suárez and Nico Rocaríes (all Spain) made their international debuts.
 Tau Koloamatangi, Vaea Fifita, Augustine Pulu and George Moala (all Tonga) made their international debuts. Fifita, Pulu and Moala had previously played for New Zealand, while Koloamatangi had previously played for Hong Kong, but all were able to change countries as a result of a change in international eligibility rules adopted by World Rugby on 24 November 2021.

Notes:
 France reclaim the Trophée des Bicentenaires for the first time since 2014.

Notes:
 Vakh Abdaladze, Luka Matkava, Guram Papidze, Tengiz Peranidze (all Georgia) and Juan Zuccarino (Uruguay) made their international debuts.

Notes:
 Alex Coles (England) made his international debut.
 Argentina recorded their first win over England since their 24–22 victory in 2009, and their first at Twickenham since 2006.

12/13 November

Notes:
 Jack Crowley, Jeremy Loughman and Cian Prendergast (all Ireland) made their international debuts.

Notes:
 Italy recorded their first ever Test victory over Australia after 18 consecutive defeats, dating back to the first meeting between the two countries in October 1983.
 Ben Donaldson and Mark Nawaqanitawase (both Australia) made their test debuts.

Notes:
 Stijn Albers, Leroy van Dam, Kevin Lenssen, Peter Lydon, Willie du Plessis, Jessy Wagemaker, Dirk Wierenga (all Netherlands), Callum Botchar and Matthew Klimchuk (both Canada) made their international debuts.

Notes:
 Mario Pichardie, Matheo Triki (both Spain), Warren Ludwig, Le Roux Malan, Wicus Jacobs and André van den Berg (all Namibia) made their international debuts.

Notes:
 Alexander Kuntelia (Georgia) made his international debut.
 Alexander Todua became the third Georgian to earn their 100th test cap.
 Samoa recorded their first win over Georgia since 2003, and their first in Georgia.

Notes:
 David Ribbans (England) made his international debut.
 Henry Slade (England) earned his 50th test cap.

Notes:
 Eliseo Morales (Argentina) made his international debut.

Notes:
 Bastien Chalureau, Reda Wardi (both France) and Manie Libbok (South Africa) made their international debuts.

Notes:
 Florin Surugiu (Romania) earned his 100th test cap.

Notes:
 Mark Telea (New Zealand) made his international debut.

19/20 November

Notes:
 Reinaldo Piussi (Uruguay) made his international debut.
 This was the first game between these two nations.

Notes:
 Namibia recorded their first ever victory over Canada.
 Kyle Steeves, Owain Ruttan (both Canada), Richard Hardwick and Darryl Wellman (both Namibia) made their international debuts.

Notes:
 South Africa recorded their biggest away victory over Italy (excluding their meeting in the 2019 Rugby World Cup, which took place in a neutral venue).

Notes:
 Georgia recorded their first win over Wales, and their first away victory against a Tier 1 nation.
 Dafydd Jenkins and Josh Macleod (both Wales) made their international debuts.
 Wales lost to a Tier 2 nation for the first time since their 23–8 loss to Japan during their 2013 tour. They also recorded their first home loss to a Tier 2 side since losing to Samoa by 26–19 in November 2012.

Notes:
 Mihai Macovei (Romania) earned his 100th test cap. He also became the player with the highest number of caps (68) as captain of Romania.
 Des Sepulona (Samoa) made his international debut.

Notes:
 Scotland recorded their biggest points total against Argentina, exceeding 50 points for the first time in 22 matches between the two nations.

Notes:
 Owen Farrell (England) became the third Englishman to earn 100 test caps.
 Brodie Retallick (New Zealand) became the 12th All Black to earn 100th test caps.
 This was only the second draw between England and New Zealand in history, and the first since December 1997.
 New Zealand retained the Hillary Shield.

Notes:
 Joe McCarthy (Ireland) made his international debut.

Notes:
 France finished 2022 unbeaten, becoming only the third team to win all their games in an entire calendar year; after New Zealand in 2013, and England in 2016.

26 November

Notes:
 Leigh Halfpenny (Wales) had been named to start but withdrew in the warm-up and was replaced by Josh Adams. Sam Costelow replaced Adams on the bench.
 Taulupe Faletau (Wales) made his 100th international appearance (95 for Wales and 5 for the British and Irish Lions).
 Joe Hawkins (Wales) and Sam Talakai (Australia) made their international debuts.
 Australia reclaimed the James Bevan Trophy for the first time since 2017.
 Wales surrendered a record-breaking 21-point lead to eventually lose a game.

Notes:
 Manu Tuilagi (England) earned his 50th test cap.

See also
 2022 July rugby union tests
 2022 South Africa rugby union tour of Europe
 2023 Rugby World Cup – Regional play-off and Final Qualification Tournament

References

2022
End-of-year rugby union internationals